British school may refer to

Schools in the United Kingdom
Schools established in the 19th century by the British and Foreign School Society
British Schools Museum in Hitchin, a surviving British and Foreign School Society school
Schools elsewhere
Member schools of the British Schools Foundation
Member schools of National Association of British Schools in Spain
The British School - Al Khubairat
British School of Archaeology in Jerusalem, now known as the Kenyon Institute
British School of Amsterdam
The British School in the Netherlands
British School at Athens
British School of Bahrain
British School of Barcelona
British School of Brussels
The British School, Caracas
The British School of Guangzhou
The British School, Panchkula
The British School, Kathmandu
The British School of Lomé, Togo
The British Schools of Montevideo
British School - Muscat
The British School, New Delhi
British School in Rome
The British School in Tokyo
British Schools of America
British American School of Charlotte
British School of Boston
British School of Chicago
British School of Houston
British School of Washington
British College
Doha British School

See also
British International Schools (disambiguation)